Maurice R. Montgomery (1938 – July 23, 2017) was an American author. He was born in eastern Montana. His works include In Search of L. L. Bean (1984), A Field Guide to Airplanes of North America, Saying Goodbye: A Memoir for Two Fathers (1989), The Way of the Trout (1991), Jefferson and the Gun-Men, and Many Rivers to Cross.

References

2017 deaths
20th-century American non-fiction writers
1938 births
20th-century American male writers
American male non-fiction writers
Writers from Montana